Greenwood River may refer to:

 Greenwood River (Brule River)
 Greenwood River (Stony River)

See also 
 Greenwood (disambiguation)